The Last President is a science fiction novel by John Barnes. It is the third of the three books constituting the Daybreak series.

Plot
In 2025 and 2026, after the Gaia-worshipping but environmentally destructive "Daybreak" movement unleashed a nanotech plague and nuclear and EMP attacks, the population of Earth has been greatly reduced and forced back to 19th-century or earlier technology. Two regions, one with its capital in Seattle, Washington and the other with its capital in Athens, Georgia, claim to be continuing the government of the U.S., while semi-independent regions around New York (increasingly fascist), in California (feudal), in Colorado (ostensibly neutral and dedicated to research and communications) and in Texas have some desire to participate in a restored U.S.  Much of the Northeast is inhabited by "tribals" who have been mysteriously brainwashed into "Daybreak", but in one of their strongholds, Lord Robert is breaking away from the movement.

Despite tensions between the secularist believers in human rights in the Northwest and the fundamentalist Christian theocrats in the South, most of the regions attempt coordinate in a military campaign against the tribals and build up to a Presidential election to reunify the country.  However, it turns out that the leaders of those regions were tricked into the campaign by Daybreak because it unifies it with Lord Robert.  The U.S. forces are defeated disastrously.  One of the leaders in Colorado makes herself president for the sole purpose of dissolving the United States and resigning.  She and other survivors of the reunification attempt find refuge in California and the West Indies, which may become centers of the drive to rebuild civilization.

Reaction
Kirkus Reviews said, "There is a fair quota of action, often involving brave defenders attempting to resist ravening zombies in human-wave assaults.  But again the cast of thousands, incessant scene shifts and sheer density of the narrative makes for tough going. Nevertheless, the story inches toward a conclusion."

References

External links

2013 American novels
American science fiction novels
Novels by John Barnes

Ace Books books